Baraboo, Wisconsin is a city in and the county seat of Sauk County, Wisconsin. 

Baraboo may also refer to:
Baraboo (town), Wisconsin, a town that includes most of the city
Baraboo-Wisconsin Dells Airport, an airport in the city
Baraboo Quartzite, a geological formation near the city
Baraboo Range, a monadnock in Wisconsin
Baraboo River, a tributary of the Wisconsin River
Baraboo (film), a 2009 drama directed by Mary Sweeney
Project Baraboo, Microsoft HoloLens, a pair of smartglasses developed by Microsoft

See also
University of Wisconsin–Baraboo/Sauk County
West Baraboo, Wisconsin